Moldova Azi is a regional online newspaper of the Moldova. The paper is a project of the Independent Journalism Center in Chişinău.

References

External links
 „Moldova Azi”

Newspapers published in Moldova
Publications with year of establishment missing
Mass media in Chișinău